All Souls Night is a 2018 Filipino horror film written and directed by Aloy Adlawan, starring Andi Eigenmann, Allan Paule and Yayo Aguila. The film was produced by Viva Films in co-production with Aliud Entertainment and ImaginePerSecond. It was released in the Philippines on October 31, 2018.

Cast

References

External links

Viva Films films
Philippine horror films